Brian Schulz is a three-time New York Emmy Award winning producer for Major League Baseball Productions in New York City. He's also one of MLB's lead cinematographers dispatched across the country to capture the game's most indelible images. Brian can also be found behind the camera shooting and directing television commercials and music videos.

Brian's work in the edit room lead to his Emmy recognition on the widely acclaimed YES Yankeeography series. A veteran of numerous All Star games and World Series his creativity behind the film and HD camera has produced stirring images that can be found in network promos, specials and World Series DVDs. Brian has also directed and shot a number of music videos and commercials that have been recognized for their mass appeal, creative story-telling and stunning imagery.

A 1997 graduate of the University of Connecticut, Brian also participated in the university's study abroad program at the University of Amsterdam in The Netherlands.
He graduated from Xavier High School in Manhattan.

Born and raised in the Marine Park section of Brooklyn, Brian is an active philanthropist and continues to give back to the community – a lesson he learned at an early age in high school.  He is an active weekend volunteer with the Lower East Side's Grand Street Settlement. He's also an integral component in their annual fundraiser, The Taste of The Lower East Side. An avid tennis player, Brian now resides in Manhattan.

References

American cinematographers
American television producers
American philanthropists
University of Connecticut alumni
Living people
Year of birth missing (living people)
Xavier High School (New York City) alumni